Sir Nicholas Alexander Faldo,  (born 18 July 1957) is an English retired professional golfer and television commentator. A top player of his era, renowned for his dedication to the game, he was ranked No. 1 on the Official World Golf Ranking for a total of 97 weeks. His 41 professional wins include 30 victories on the European Tour and six major championships: three Open Championships (1987, 1990, 1992) and three Masters (1989, 1990, 1996).

Faldo has since become a television commentator for major golf championships. In 2006, he became the lead golf analyst for CBS Sports. In 2012, Faldo joined the BBC Sport on-air team for coverage of the Open Championship.

Playing career

Early years
Faldo was born in Welwyn Garden City, Hertfordshire, England, in 1957, as the only child of Joyce and George Faldo, an accountant at Imperial Chemical Industries. Responding to suggestions that Faldo might be an Italian surname, George Faldo stated it is of English origin, and had traced it to a 13th-century Knight in Bedford.

Faldo "became hooked" on golf at the age of 14—having never "even picked up a golf club" himself, watching Jack Nicklaus play the 1971 Masters on his parents' new colour television (his first exposure to the game). Just three years later, Faldo qualified to play in the 1974 English Amateur at Woodhall Spa. In 1975 he won both the English Amateur at Royal Lytham and the British Youths Open Amateur Championship. His successes came too late to gain a Walker Cup place that year, the match being played in late May with the team selected in November 1974. He represented Great Britain in the Commonwealth Tournament in South Africa in November 1975. Faldo describes his late discovery of golf enthusiastically, saying that he "love[d] school, until golf came along"—after which "the only thing [he] was interested in was getting out of the gates as quick as possible and going to the golf course."

Professional career 1977–1992
Faldo's golf prowess was soon noticed in the United States, where he was given a golf scholarship to the University of Houston. He attended for ten weeks, but he felt the distraction of going to school hurt his golf game. After leaving the school, Faldo then turned professional in 1976 and joined the European Professional Golfers Association. Faldo achieved instant European Tour successes, finishing eighth on the Order of Merit in 1977, and third in 1978; and winning a European Tour event in each of those seasons (in 1977, he became the then-youngest Ryder Cup player at the age of 20).

Faldo continued his European Tour successes in the early 1980s, winning two consecutive Sun Alliance PGA Championships in England, in 1980 and 1981. Faldo finished top of the Order of Merit in 1983, with five European Tour victories.

In the mid-1980s, Faldo began rebuilding his swing under the tutelage of David Leadbetter, to reorder his game and become a regular contender in major championships (many contemporaries and commentators viewed his all-encompassing swing change as excessive, although later players have adopted similar strategies to varying degrees—most notably, Tiger Woods). Leadbetter felt that although Faldo's swing "looked beautiful," and had "marvelous rhythm," it "camouflaged a number of faults". After a series of setbacks, Faldo's efforts paid off in May 1987, when he won the Peugeot Spanish Open, his first European Tour victory since 1984 (Faldo later said the win was a "major turning point," which restored his confidence).

Two months later, in July 1987, Faldo claimed his first major title at The Open Championship at Muirfield. After rounds of 68 (-3) and 69 (-2), Faldo emerged through stormy conditions with an even-par 71, thus entering the final round one stroke behind American Paul Azinger. Faldo parred every hole in his final round for a one-shot victory. At one point Azinger held a lead of three shots with nine holes to play, but bogeys at four of his last nine holes, including at the 17th and 18th, placed him a stroke behind Faldo. In cool misty weather conditions, Faldo's solid and steady play in the final round won him the Open title a day after his 30th birthday. He holed a five-foot putt on the final hole for his 18th consecutive par. Faldo later said: "I knew I'd do it. And I knew I had to do it." Highlighting a bunker shot on the 8th hole as a key shot of his final round, Faldo said: "The one at 8 was fantastic, a 35-yard shot and I knocked it to three feet."

At the 1988 U.S. Open, Faldo ended 72 holes of regulation play in a tie for the lead with Curtis Strange. Faldo's even-par fourth round of 71 started with 14 consecutive pars. A birdie on the 15th hole gave him a share of the lead with Strange. However, on the 16th hole Faldo found himself with a difficult bunker shot to play. After backing away from his bunker shot to scold some photographers for talking, Faldo made his lone bogey. Strange dropped a shot on the 17th to leave the two rivals tied for the lead on the 18th tee. Faldo missed a 25-foot birdie putt on the 18th green which would have made him the first British player since Tony Jacklin in 1970 to hold both major national championships. The following day, Strange won the 18-hole Monday playoff by four strokes. Strange shot an even-par round of 71, while Faldo struggled with a round of 75.

Faldo won his second major championship at the 1989 Masters. Starting his fourth round five shots off the lead held by Ben Crenshaw, Faldo's final round of 65 (consisting of eight birdies, nine pars and one bogey) was the low round of the tournament and enabled him to get into a playoff with Scott Hoch. Displaying some brilliant putting in his final round, Faldo holed a 50-foot birdie putt on the first hole and followed this up with birdies on the 2nd, 4th and 7th holes. On the back nine, Faldo holed birdie putts of 12 feet at the 13th, 5 feet at the 14th, 15 feet (with an 8-foot break) at the 16th, and 30 feet at the 17th. On the first hole of the ensuing sudden-death playoff, Hoch missed a 2-foot par putt that would have won him the tournament. On the 2nd playoff hole, amid the growing evening darkness, Faldo holed a 25-foot birdie putt to win the tournament.

At the 1990 Masters, Faldo successfully defended his Masters title. He came from behind to get into a playoff with Raymond Floyd, once again winning on the second playoff hole after Floyd pulled his approach shot into a pond left of the green. Faldo became the first player to win back-to-back Masters titles since Jack Nicklaus in 1965–66.

In the next major at the 1990 U.S. Open at Medinah Country Club, Faldo finished tied for 3rd place. In his final round of 69 he three-putted from 45 feet on the 16th hole for a bogey and missed a 12-foot birdie putt on the 18th, which lipped out of the hole. This resulted in him missing out by one stroke on an 18-hole playoff with Hale Irwin and Mike Donald. Faldo refused to come to the press tent after his final round and later, en route to the locker room, snapped at a journalist who suggested that he had hit his putt too hard on the final green. Faldo said: "I hit it perfect. I hit a foot past the hole. How can you say I hit it too hard?"

The following month, Faldo won his second Open Championship at St Andrews, Scotland, by five shots, becoming the first golfer since Tom Watson in 1982 to win two majors in the same year.

Faldo won the famous Claret Jug trophy for a third time in the 1992 Open Championship at Muirfield. Faldo's first two rounds of 66-64 for a 36-hole total of 130 broke the Open Championship record for the lowest first 36 holes (a record later tied by Brandt Snedeker in 2012). Faldo had a 54-hole lead of four shots in the 1992 Open, before losing the lead during the back-nine of the final round to American John Cook. Faldo recovered with birdies on two of the last four holes to win by a stroke over Cook, who bogeyed the 72nd hole.

Perceived by some golf fans to be an aloof stoic character in the mould of Ben Hogan, Faldo displayed visible emotion after his Open-winning putt on the final hole at Muirfield in 1992, trembling and shedding tears. Faldo later said: "I thought I'd blown it. If I had lost, I would have needed a very large plaster to patch that one up."

Faldo claimed the European Tour Order of Merit a second time in 1992. During that time, Faldo said of his success: "The run doesn't have to end. If someone is going to beat me then I'm going to make sure they've worked for their victory. Let them come and get it from me." That year, he had worldwide earnings of £1,558,978, breaking the existing record.

Professional career 1993–2015
In July 1993, Faldo won the Carroll's Irish Open for an unprecedented third time in a row. Starting his final round four shots behind José María Olazábal, Faldo's fourth round of 65 enabled him to tie over 72 holes with Olazábal. Faldo won the sudden death playoff at the first extra hole. Later that month, as defending Open champion, Faldo was involved in a memorable duel with rival Greg Norman in the Open Championship at Royal St George's Golf Club. Starting his final round one shot ahead of Norman, Faldo hit a tee shot on the par-3 11th which appeared to be heading for a hole in one, but the ball hit the cup and rolled away. Faldo played some excellent golf in his final round of 67, but he finished runner-up, two strokes behind Norman, who shot a spectacular final round of 64.

Throughout the early 1990s, Faldo remained a European Tour player while also visiting America regularly and playing events around the world, but in 1995 he decided to concentrate on playing on the U.S. PGA Tour, as his priority was to win further major championships (and three out of the four majors are played in the United States). At first this strategy didn't seem to work, as he had a moderate 1995 season, but in April 1996 he won a famous victory at Augusta to collect his sixth and final major championship.

Faldo went into the final round at the 1996 Masters trailing Greg Norman by six shots, but was the beneficiary of an infamous Sunday collapse at Augusta by Norman; Faldo shot a 67 to win by five over Norman, who struggled mightily en route to a 78. Though this is commonly remembered as the tournament where Norman collapsed in the final round, Faldo's 67 was a memorable display of concentration and consistency which put pressure on Norman. After Faldo finished, he hugged Norman and whispered something in his ear, which years later Norman confirmed to have included the line "Don't let the bastards get you down," a reference to the media, which Faldo assumed would aggressively hound Norman for the loss. Norman said in interview after defeat that "He (Faldo) had gone way, way up in my estimations." Since then they have become friends and fishing partners, a passion they both share.

After Faldo's victory at the 1996 Masters, he had just one further tournament win in his career at the 1997 Nissan Open in Los Angeles, at the age of 39. As Faldo entered his forties, his form gradually declined and he devoted more time to off-course activities. The last season that he played regularly on the PGA Tour was 2001. Afterwards, he refocused on the European Tour and consistently played less than a full schedule.

At the 2002 U.S. Open, a month before his 45th birthday, Faldo finished in a very creditable position of tied for 5th place. At the 2003 Open Championship at Royal St George's, Faldo shot a fine third round of 67 and was briefly in contention for the tournament during the final round. He closed to within two shots of the lead after a birdie at the 5th hole in the final round before holing a 30-foot eagle putt on the 7th. However, his momentum stalled over the next three holes. A birdie at the 14th hole took him to level par and into fourth place. However, three successive bogeys on his subsequent three holes ended his challenge and he finished the tournament in a tie for eighth place. It was Faldo's last top-10 finish in a major championship.

After 2005, Faldo's appearances in professional tournaments became increasingly sporadic. In 2006, apart from appearances in the Masters and at the Open Championship, Faldo played in only two other events on the European Tour that year. In the first half of 2007, Faldo did not appear in any regular tour events. He did play in the 2007 Open at Carnoustie, missing the cut. In his first Champions Tour event, he finished tied for 14th in the Senior British Open.

Faldo did not take part in the 2008 Open at Royal Birkdale. It was the first time he had not taken part in the competition since failing to qualify as an amateur in 1975. He entered in 2009 at Turnberry and 2010 at St Andrews, but missed the 36-hole cut at both. Faldo opted not to take part in the 2011 Open at Royal St George's. He also decided not to compete in the 2012 Open, instead joining the BBC Sport commentary team for the event. Faldo competed at the 2013 Open at Muirfield. He missed the cut. Faldo decided to make the 2015 Open at St Andrews his final Open Championship appearance.

As of January 2015, Faldo's career European Tour earnings are just over €8 million, and his U.S. PGA Tour earnings are over $5 million.

Achievements and legacy
Faldo has won more major golf championships than any player from the continent of Europe since World War I. Only one European golfer, Harry Vardon, who won seven majors in a span between 1896 and 1914, has had more major victories than Faldo. Other than Vardon, only one golfer from outside the United States (Gary Player from South Africa) has won more majors than Faldo.

Faldo was named the PGA Tour Player of the Year in 1990 and the European Tour Player of the Year in 1989, 1990 and 1992, and has won 29 European Tour titles. While his professional tournament wins (40) pale in quantity to that of contemporaries Greg Norman, Seve Ballesteros, and Bernhard Langer, the prestige and stature of his successes are impressive, and he has more major victories than any of these players.

Faldo's CV boasts (often multiple) successes in high-profile tour events such as the French Open, Irish Open, Spanish Open, the European PGA, the British Masters, the European Open, the Johnnie Walker Classic, and the Volvo Masters, as well as his Nissan Open, Doral Open, and Heritage successes in the US. These wins are not only supplemented by his six majors, but also by his wins in invitational events such as the Nedbank Million Dollar Challenge, the Johnnie Walker World Golf Championship, and the World Matchplay, as well as his team successes in the Dunhill Cup, the World Cup of Golf, and the Ryder Cup.

For much of the early 1990s, Faldo was considered the best golfer in the world. He spent a total of 97 weeks altogether at the top of the Official World Golf Ranking, an achievement surpassed by only one other competitor, Greg Norman, during the decade of the 1990s. His total of six professional major tournament wins were more than any other player in the world from 1987 through 1996. (Nick Price was second with three major victories during this period; Seve Ballesteros won five majors from 1979 to 1988).

Faldo is one of the most successful Ryder Cup players ever, having won 25 points and having represented the European Team a record 11 times. He played a key role in making Europe competitive in the event. Having won 23 of his matches, lost 19, and halved 4, he also holds the European record for having played the most Ryder Cup matches.

Former Walker Cup captain Peter McEvoy said of Faldo: "He is a leading contender to be Britain's finest ever sportsman in an individual sport. He is the gold standard from which the rest of modern British golf has to be judged."

In 2003, PGA chief executive Sandy Jones said of Faldo's career: "His career achievements position him as Britain's best golfer of all time. But it is his dedication and commitment to the game which really sets him apart."

The careers of Faldo and his archrival for many years, Greg Norman, were profiled by Golf World magazine: "Norman has played and won more events: 87–43; however, Faldo has won more U.S. and European tour titles: 36–34. Norman has won more money; Faldo has won more majors: 6–2. Norman has won more friends, Faldo more admirers; Norman had more women, Faldo had more fast cars."

Playing style
Faldo's remarkable composure under pressure and intimidating presence were hallmarks of his game. Faldo's final round of 18 consecutive pars in cool misty conditions at Muirfield during the 1987 Open Championship was an example of steady play under pressure. Former player and BBC commentator Peter Alliss suggested that much of the flair in Faldo's game was lost in the mid-1980s when he remodelled his swing. Alliss said: "Faldo had cut out the excitement, but he had also eradicated the mistakes."

It's been suggested that during his career Faldo wore down the opposition and benefited from other players making mistakes in pressure-filled situations. His three Masters titles at Augusta came after mistakes by Scott Hoch missing a short putt in 1989, Raymond Floyd hitting an approach shot into a pond in 1990 and from a collapse by Greg Norman in the final round in 1996. Two of Faldo's Open Championship wins came after mistakes in the closing two holes by Paul Azinger in 1987 and John Cook in 1992. Nevertheless, Faldo earns credit for the way in which he performed under pressure in his major victories.

Although not a particularly powerful player for a tall man, Faldo's strengths included his distance control, course management and his strong competitive mind. He was renowned for his single-minded dedication to the game. His intense dedication meant that he attended to every detail in the golf swing. Gary Player said of Faldo: "He had a work ethic that was quite unbelievable."

After Faldo changed his swing in the mid-1980s, his methodical style gave him a reputation for being one of the game's more conservative players. However, Faldo did shoot some spectacular rounds of golf at the height of his career. For three consecutive Open Championships between 1992 and 1994, Faldo carded one round of fewer than 65 strokes in each of the three Opens, shooting a 64 at Muirfield in 1992, a 63 at Royal St George's in 1993, and a 64 at Turnberry in 1994.

Faldo had a reputation for being an insular character who did not engage in any of the usual social courtesies. He generally kept other players at arm's length. Faldo was described as having "an intense focus that peers found less than endearing." In 2002, Faldo's former Ryder Cup colleague Sandy Lyle said: "I've never known Nick. If he walked past me right now, he wouldn't stop to talk. He wouldn't even say hello."

In the 1991 Ryder Cup, Faldo received criticism in the media for his conduct during a 7&6 foursomes defeat suffered with debutant David Gilford. The two English players scarcely spoke and, as Faldo was the senior partner, it was suggested that he should have done more to put him at ease. Gilford later said of Faldo: "I am a big fan of what he has achieved, but he's not a wonderful man."

During a 1995 Ryder Cup match, Tom Lehman was critical of Faldo for not clearly telling him to pick his ball up when it was a foot away from the hole. Lehman said: "Faldo mumbled something, then made a gesture to me." This angered the American who said: "I told him to speak clearly. He stretched his arms out as if to say, 'Put the ball in your pocket, you idiot.' "

In 1998, Faldo's partnership with David Leadbetter came to an acrimonious end when Faldo dispensed with his services by post in a letter. The two men have reportedly not spoken since. In 2003, Leadbetter said of Faldo: "He wasn't the most popular guy with all the players, that's for sure. He didn't go out to win friends and influence people. Very seldom does he call people by name. He was very difficult to get close to. But I don't think it hurt his performance. You don't have to be 'Mr Popular' to win golf tournaments."

Faldo's strong work ethic was praised by Leadbetter, who said that during uncomfortably hot conditions in the summer heat of Florida, a conservative estimate of Faldo's practice levels would be him hitting "500–800 balls a day, every day". Leadbetter said: "I don't know how many balls we hit in total but it was thousands and thousands. He also kept up his short game too – he worked hard on that aspect of his game."

In an interview in 2005, Curtis Strange said: "Nick Faldo stared a lot of guys down. He had a way of folding his arms and looking at you as though he knew you were going to make a mistake. But in our playoff in the 1988 U.S. Open, I was in a good frame of mind to handle him. We didn't say three words all day, which was fine with me. I'm proud of beating him when he was in his prime."

Nick Dougherty, who won three Faldo Junior Series events and went on to win tournaments on the European Tour, said of Faldo: "He's the most driven human being I've ever known. People say Tiger Woods created the new breed of golfer but I believe Nick Faldo did."

In 1990, British golf writer Peter Dobereiner suggested that Faldo was "a loner to the point of standoffishness" and "obsessively driven by the impossible dream of technical perfection."

2008 Ryder Cup captaincy
Faldo was selected as captain of the European Ryder Cup team in 2008. The 37th Ryder Cup was won 16½ – 11½ by Team USA to end the streak of three successive victories for Team Europe. This was Team USA's largest margin of victory since 1981, and the first time since 1979 the Americans had the lead after every session of play. It was held at the Valhalla Golf Club in Louisville, Kentucky, USA, which was a contributing factor in Faldo getting the captaincy; he had lived and worked in America for over a decade.

Faldo had made a bold move to pick Ian Poulter as his wild card ahead of the much favoured Darren Clarke, who already had two tour victories that season, including the KLM Open, which took place just two weeks before the captain's picks were announced. This decision, questioned by many, paid off when Poulter emerged as the top scorer in the tournament.

Faldo had an erratic relationship with the media prior to and during the competition. During practice, photographers had taken pictures of him holding a list of players' initials, seemingly outlining the partnerships for the coming days. In the following press conference, he denied the list had any part in his tactics, and claimed it was a list of the players' sandwich orders. This was met with skepticism from the media, which notably irritated Faldo when he was asked continuing questions about it. Faldo eventually admitted they were in fact possible player pairings and he'd been "caught out".

Faldo's attempts at humour in the opening ceremony seemed to fall flat with the audience. Faldo also brought more criticism upon himself by taking up the majority of his opening speech by talking about himself and his family. Introducing Graeme McDowell, Faldo asked: "Where do you come from again? Ireland or Northern Ireland?"

Faldo controversially decided to play Sergio García and Lee Westwood, the two most successful Ryder Cup players on his team, for only one session on the Saturday. His team selection was vindicated, however, as Europe finished the day 1 point ahead, closing the gap to 2 points behind the USA. On the final day of the competition, Faldo decided to play a "bottom-heavy" tactic, where the best players would start lower down the order; thus, if it went to a close finish, Europe would have its best players in play. This tactic seemed to backfire, as the US, leading by 2 at the start of the day, gained the 5 points they required by the eighth match, rendering the last four irrelevant. This led to media criticism of Faldo's strategic skills.

Broadcasting career
After cutting back on his playing schedule, Faldo became a broadcaster for ABC Sports' PGA Tour coverage, where he worked from 2004 to 2006 alongside former playing rival Paul Azinger and host Mike Tirico. While never considered to be a particularly charismatic player, Faldo surprised many fans with his dry, British wit and insightful commentary as part of the ABC team. The trio garnered many positive reviews, with Faldo and Azinger often exchanging verbal barbs and engaging in humorous banter.

On 3 October 2006, it was announced that Faldo had signed a contract with CBS to replace Lanny Wadkins as the network's lead golf analyst. Faldo said, "I view this as a fabulous opportunity for me, which may come once every ten years. But it will seriously curtail my playing career. My playing days aren't completely over but my priority now is given to CBS." Faldo's decision meant he missed the 2007 Masters, an event he had won three times. In 2007 he also became the lead analyst for Golf Channel's coverage on the PGA Tour. Faldo has garnered less positive support since he began working on his own.  He and Azinger did have a pair of reunion telecasts, one for each of the analysts' employers. Faldo joined Azinger and Tirico on ABC for the 2007 Open Championship.  Meanwhile, Azinger joined Faldo and Brian Hammons on Golf Channel for the 2009 Presidents Cup.

Faldo retired from CBS after 16 years in the broadcast booth; his final regular broadcast was at the Wyndham Championship, in August 2022.

Other activities and awards
In 1991, Faldo launched his golf course design practice Faldo Design.  As a way of opening his first course design in the UK (Chart Hills in Kent), Faldo teed up on the dog-leg right par five. He drove into the middle-right of the fairway, he then teed another ball and drove off; the two balls finished within 6 inches of each other and to this day can be seen set into the fairway in a protective case. This was a mark of the man's golfing ability at his peak. Known golf design associates of Faldo Design have been Paul Jansen, Steve Smyers, Adam Calver.  Faldo designed several golf courses, including:
Chart Hills Golf Club (Kent, England)
Sporting Club Berlin
Elea Estate
Cottonwood Hills near Hutchinson, Kansas
The Fortress at Louisbourg Resort, Cape Breton Island, Canada(Closed)
San Miguel de Allende, México, 2010
Angkor Golf Resort
Laguna Lang Co
Mission Hills (Faldo course), China
Emirates (Faldo course), Dubai, UAE
Rumanza golf course, Pakistan, 2020
Silk Path Dong Trieu, Hanoi, Vietnam (construction, estimated completion 2023)

Faldo's other business interests include coaching schools and pro shops. In 1996 he launched the Faldo Series to provide opportunities to young golfers, under the age of 21 from around the world, both male and female. There are over 7,000 participants each year and there are 38 tournaments in 28 countries. Age category winners at each event qualify for either the Faldo Series Grand Final, hosted each year by Faldo at the Lough Erne Golf Resort, Northern Ireland or the Faldo Series Asia Grand Final, also hosted by Faldo at Mission Hills Golf Club, Shenzen, China (A Faldo Design course). The registered charity boasts a number of successful graduates, the most notable being; Rory McIlroy, Yani Tseng, and Nick Dougherty.

Along with the Marriott hotel chain, Faldo established The Faldo Golf Institute in 1997. This is a golf instructional programme designed to help golfers of every level improve their skills and enjoyment of golf. The institute has five locations: Orlando, Florida; Atlantic City, New Jersey; Palm Desert, California; Marco Island, Florida; and Hertfordshire, UK.

In 2007, Mercedes-Benz signed Faldo to act as brand ambassador to promote the revival of the Maybach brand of ultra-luxury automobiles.

Faldo has written several golf instructional books.

Knighthood and other honours
Faldo was voted BBC Sports Personality of the Year in 1989 and inducted into the World Golf Hall of Fame in 1998. In 2000, Faldo was ranked 18th greatest golfer of all time by Golf Digest magazine. In a 2019 article on England's best golfers, Golf Monthly described Faldo as "arguably the greatest English player of all time".

He was awarded the MBE in 1988 New Year Honours, then made a Knight Bachelor in the 2009 Birthday Honours for his services to golf.

Faldo was announced as the 2014 recipient of the Payne Stewart Award on 9 September 2014.

Personal life
Faldo met his first wife, Melanie Rockall, when he was 21. They married in 1979 but separated less than five years later when she discovered he was having an affair with his manager's secretary, Gill Bennett. Faldo later said of his relationship with Rockall: "We were happily married for eight months. Unfortunately, we were married for four-and-a-half years."

Faldo's divorce from Rockall came before his major championship successes and her settlement was relatively small. He married Bennett in 1986 and the couple had three children: Natalie, Matthew and Georgia. When Faldo moved to America in 1995 to play full-time on the PGA tour, Bennett stayed at home in England. The marriage ended later that year after Faldo began a relationship with 20-year-old American golfing student Brenna Cepelak. Gill Bennett later revealed that the births of their three children had been induced to avoid any clashes with Faldo's playing schedule. She said of Faldo: "Socially, he was a 24-handicapper."

Faldo's three-year affair with Cepelak ended when he met Valerie Bercher. The spurned Cepelak famously battered Faldo's Porsche 959 with a golf club, reportedly causing damage of £10,000. Faldo's relationship with Bercher, a Swiss PR agent, began in 1998 when they met at the European Masters golf tournament. At the time, Bercher was working for marketing company IMG. She left her fiancé Olivier Delaloye and married Faldo in July 2001 in a lavish ceremony at his Windsor home. They have a daughter Emma Scarlet (born 2003). It was announced in May 2006 that Faldo had filed for divorce.

Faldo married his fourth wife Lindsay De Marco in December 2020, in the Florida Keys, after their wedding at Kensington Palace had to be called off due to the COVID-19 pandemic.

Professional wins (43)

PGA Tour wins (9)

PGA Tour playoff record (2–1)

European Tour wins (30)

European Tour playoff record (9–4)

Sunshine Tour wins (1)

Other wins (9)

Other playoff record (2–0)

Major championships

Wins (6)

1Defeated Scott Hoch in a sudden-death playoff: Faldo (5-3) and Hoch (5-x). 
2Defeated Raymond Floyd in a sudden-death playoff: Faldo (4-4) and Floyd (4-x).

Results timeline

WD = withdrew
CUT = missed the halfway cut
"T" indicates a tie for a place.

Summary

Most consecutive cuts made – 27 (1987 Open Championship – 1994 Masters)
Longest streak of top-10s – 4 (1988 U.S. Open – 1989 Masters and 1989 PGA – 1990 Open Championship)

Results in The Players Championship

CUT = missed the halfway cut
DQ = disqualified
"T" indicates a tie for a place

Results in World Golf Championships

1Cancelled due to 9/11

QF, R16, R32, R64 = Round in which player lost in match play
"T" = Tied
NT = No tournament

Team appearances
Amateur
Commonwealth Tournament (representing Great Britain): 1975

Professional
Ryder Cup (representing GB & Ireland / Europe): 1977, 1979, 1981, 1983, 1985 (winners), 1987 (winners), 1989 (tied match and retained trophy), 1991, 1993, 1995 (winners), 1997 (winners), 2008 (non-playing captain)
World Cup (representing England): 1977, 1991, 1998 (winners)
Double Diamond International (representing England): 1977
Hennessy Cognac Cup (representing Great Britain & Ireland): 1978 (winners), 1980 (winners), 1982 (winners), (representing England) 1984 (winners, captain)
Dunhill Cup (representing England): 1985, 1986, 1987 (winners), 1988, 1991, 1993
Four Tours World Championship (representing Europe): 1986, 1987, 1990 (captain)
UBS Cup (representing the Rest of the World): 2001, 2002, 2003 (tie)
Royal Trophy (representing Europe): 2006 (winners)
Seve Trophy (representing Great Britain & Ireland): 2007 (non-playing captain – winners)

See also
List of celebrities who own wineries and vineyards
List of golfers with most European Tour wins
List of golfers with most PGA Tour wins
List of men's major championships winning golfers
List of World Number One male golfers

References

External links

Profile at Hello! magazine
Faldo course at Emirates Golf Club
The Faldo Golf Institute by Marriott

English male golfers
Houston Cougars men's golfers
European Tour golfers
PGA Tour golfers
PGA Tour Champions golfers
Winners of men's major golf championships
World Golf Hall of Fame inductees
Ryder Cup competitors for Europe
Golf course architects
Golf writers and broadcasters
Knights Bachelor
Members of the Order of the British Empire
People in sports awarded knighthoods
BBC Sports Personality of the Year winners
British businesspeople
English expatriate sportspeople in the United States
Golfers from Orlando, Florida
Sportspeople from Welwyn Garden City
Sportspeople from Winter Park, Florida
1957 births
Living people
Conservative Party (UK) people
People named in the Panama Papers